Jules Meese (3 September 1896 – 1 December 1968) was a French lightweight weightlifter. In 1925 he set a world record in the press at 92.5 kg. He competed at the 1928 Summer Olympics and finished in sixth place.

References

1896 births
1968 deaths
Olympic weightlifters of France
Weightlifters at the 1928 Summer Olympics
French male weightlifters
20th-century French people